Antonette Wilken (born 9 June 1961) is a Zimbabwean diver. She competed at the 1980 Summer Olympics and the 1984 Summer Olympics.

References

1961 births
Living people
Zimbabwean female divers
Olympic divers of Zimbabwe
Divers at the 1980 Summer Olympics
Divers at the 1984 Summer Olympics
Sportspeople from Harare